Olderbark Mountain is a mountain located in the Catskill Mountains of New York east-southeast of Lanesville. Twin Mountain is located east-northeast, and Little Rocky Mountain is located west of Olderbark Mountain.

References

Mountains of Greene County, New York
Mountains of New York (state)